Lori Dennis (born August 14, 1969) is an interior designer, author, and lecturer.

Early life
Dennis grew up poor. Her mother was a hippie and moved to California from New York with her two children to attend school. Dennis developed her interest in design and architecture at an early age. As a teenager, she would go on dates at open houses.

Prior to interior design, Dennis was a stockbroker who rehabbed and sold homes on the side. She would reupholster furniture as a cost saving measure and later began to design her own furniture.

Career
Dennis graduated from the UCLA Interior Architecture Master's Program in July 2000. While completing coursework, Dennis was In-house Designer for SeminarPlanet.com. In 1999, she went to work for Cheryl Rowley Interior Design. A year later, she established her own firm, Lori Dennis, Inc. Lori Dennis, Inc. specializes in sustainable (green or eco-friendly) interior design, and she is currently the principal designer of the firm. They are one of the nation's top Green Interior Design Firms, presented with the Greeopia Award in 2008, as well as the HOME Magazine "2008 Best Green Remodel" award.

In 2006, Dennis passed the NCIDQ Exam (National Council for Interior Design Qualification) and became a full member of the American Society of Interior Designers.

In 2013, Dennis and designer Kelli Ellis founded Interior Design Camp. She also joined as a star of Real Designing Women, a television show that aired on HGTVCanada.

Sustainability 
Dennis describes her design philosophy incorporates sustainability and feng shui. Dennis is a LEED certified interior designer.

Her book, Green Interior Design, published by Allworth Press and distributed by Random House, was published in the fall of 2010.

References

External links

 

1969 births
Living people
American interior designers
UCLA School of the Arts and Architecture alumni
American women interior designers